The Blue Bonnets Raceway (later named Hippodrome de Montréal) was a horse racing track and casino in Montreal, Quebec, Canada. It closed on October 13, 2009, after 137 years of operation.

Demolition of the site began in mid-2018, after sitting abandoned and derelict for nearly a decade.

History
In 1905, John F. Ryan founded the Jockey Club of Montreal which on June 4, 1907, opened a Blue Bonnets Raceway on Decarie Boulevard. In 1958, Jean-Louis Levesque undertook major renovations that included building a multi-million-dollar clubhouse for the Blue Bonnets Raceway and by 1961, it began to challenge the preeminence of the Ontario racing industry. From 1961 and 1975, the Raceway was home to the Quebec Derby, an annual horse race conceived by Levesque.

Controversy erupted when the Namur metro station was built in close proximity to the Blue Bonnets Raceway. The Montreal Tramways Company had run streetcars right into the race track site. Some argued that the metro station site was chosen to benefit Blue Bonnets while others argued that the tram stations would address future traffic problems. This controversy coincided with a failed Blue Bonnets Development project.

In 1995, a municipal government corporation, Le Société d'habitation et de développement de Montréal (SHDM), purchased the track and renamed it Hippodrome de Montréal. Owned and operated by the provincial government agency SONACC (Société nationale du cheval de course), it offered harness racing, inter-track wagering from the United States, off-track betting, two restaurants and hundreds of video lottery terminals and slot machines.

Presidents
 H. Montagu Allan (1907–1920)
 J. K. L. Ross (1920–1931)
 Kenneth Thomas Dawes (1931–1933)
 Joseph Cattarinich (1933–1938)
 J.-Eugene Lajoie (1938–1939)
 Louis Letourneau (1939–1942)
 J. Eugene Lajoie (1942–1958)
 Jean-Louis Levesque (1958–1970)
 Raymond Lemay (1970–1973)
 Alban Cadieux (1973–1983)
 Andre Marier (1983–1994)
 Gilbert l'Heureux (1994–1995)
 Jacques Brulotte (1995–2000)
 Jean-Pierre Lareau (2000–2002)
 Richard Castonguay (2002–2007)
 Senator Paul Massicotte (2007–2009)

Press secretaries
 Charles Mayer (1950s)

Bankruptcy and closure
On June 27, 2008, Attractions Hippiques entered bankruptcy protection, suspending horse racing and all other operations except its VLT gambling machines and inter-track wagering, which operated for a few more months. After the provincial government withdrew its support, Attractions Hippiques declared bankruptcy on October 13, 2009, and permanently closed the race track.

Post-closure and uncertain future of the site

In July 2011, the rock band U2 used the site for a massive outdoor concert.

On March 23, 2012, the Government of Quebec announced it was returning ownership of the land to the City of Montreal, on condition it would get half of the profits from any sale of the land. As per the agreement the land could not be sold until 2017 and would require decontamination. In October 2014, it was brought to light the government agreement was never signed nor finalized, leaving the redevelopment project in limbo and its future in question. Plans to demolish the race track and clubhouse building by 2014 also fell through, leaving the buildings abandoned and grounds overgrown for nearly a decade. In the summer of 2018, demolition of the former racetrack finally began; however, plans for any future redevelopment of the site remain uncertain.

See also

 Harness racing
 Horse racing
 Montreal

References

External links

 Hippodrome closes under bankruptcy protection
 Public documentation on Attraction Hippiques bankruptcy available on RSM Richter's accounting services site
 Montreal Gazette article on closure - All Bets Are Off

Defunct horse racing venues in Canada
Sports venues in Montreal
Landmarks in Montreal
History of Montreal
1872 establishments in Quebec
2009 disestablishments in Quebec
Côte-des-Neiges–Notre-Dame-de-Grâce
Horse racing venues in Quebec
Sports venues completed in 1872